Rev. William Montgomery (1871–1930) was a Presbyterian minister and a British codebreaker who worked in Room 40 during World War I.

Montgomery and Nigel de Grey deciphered the Zimmermann Telegram, which helped bring the U.S. into World War I. At this time (1917), Montgomery was 45.

He was an authority on Augustine of Hippo and a translator of theological works from German. No work, it was said, had ever been so idiomatically and yet so faithfully rendered as his translation of Albert Schweitzer's Quest of the Historical Jesus, published in 1914.

References

External links
 
 

British people of World War I
Signals intelligence of World War I
Pre-computer cryptographers
British cryptographers
20th-century Presbyterian ministers
1871 births
1930 deaths